William Herman Katt (born Herman August Wilhelm Katt; May 15, 1915 – September 21, 1992), known as Bill Williams, was an American television and film actor. He is best known for his starring role in the early television series The Adventures of Kit Carson, which aired in syndication from 1951 to 1955.

Life and career
Williams was born in Brooklyn, New York to German immigrant parents. He attended the Pratt Institute, and became a professional swimmer, performing in underwater shows. He landed a walk-on role as a theater usher in King Kong (1933). He enlisted in the United States Army during World War II, but was discharged before the end and became an actor. His credited debut was in Murder in the Blue Room in 1944, using the professional name Bill Williams. His first starring role was opposite Susan Hayward in Deadline at Dawn (1946).

Williams appeared in ten films before he landed the lead role in television's The Adventures of Kit Carson, which ran for 105 episodes. When the series ended, Williams' star power faded. It was revived in 1957 when he co-starred with Betty White on television in Date with the Angels. Williams portrayed Federal agent Martin Flaherty in The Scarface Mob (1959), the pilot for ABC's The Untouchables. However, when the series was accepted, the role went to Jerry Paris. Williams turned down the lead in Sea Hunt in 1958, believing that an underwater show would not work on television. Lloyd Bridges accepted the part and turned it into a hit. Williams did star as a former Navy frogman in Assignment: Underwater, which ran for just one season. He played a variety of roles on Perry Mason, in which his wife Barbara Hale co-starred as Raymond Burr's secretary Della Street. In a 1962 episode, "The Case of the Crippled Cougar," he played defendant Mike Preston. In 1963, he was murder victim Floyd Grant in "The Case of the Bluffing Blast." In 1965 Williams played murderer Charles Shaw in "The Case of the Murderous Mermaid," and was murder victim Burt Payne in "The Case of the 12th Wildcat". Williams appeared with his son in a final season episode of Ironside, bringing him together again with Raymond Burr. He also made numerous guest appearances on television and worked in low-budget science fiction films until his retirement.

Personal life
Williams married actress Barbara Hale on June 22, 1946. They met during the filming of West of the Pecos and had two daughters, Jodi and Juanita, and a son, actor William Katt.

Bill Williams died of a brain tumor at age 77 in 1992 and is buried at Forest Lawn Memorial Park (Hollywood Hills).

For his contributions to television, Bill Williams has a star on the Hollywood Walk of Fame. It is at 6161 Hollywood Blvd.

Acting roles

Star of his own television series
 The Adventures of Kit Carson TV series (1951–1955) as Kit Carson, 105 episodes
 Date with the Angels (1957–1958) as Gus Angel, 33 episodes
 Assignment: Underwater (1960–1961) as Bill Greer, 39 episodes

Multiple appearances on a television series

 Schlitz Playhouse of Stars
Well of Anger (1955) 
Angels in the Sky (1956)
 Science Fiction Theatre
The Hastings Secret (1955) as Bill Twining
Project 44 (1956) as Dr. Arnold Bryan
The Mind Machine (1956) as Dr. Alan Cathcart
Jupitron (1956) as Dr. John Barlow
 Killer Tree (1957) as Paul Cameron
 Walt Disney's Wonderful World of Color
Texas John Slaughter:
The Man From Bitter Creek (1959) as Paul
The Slaughter Trail (1959) as Paul
 Gallagher Goes West
Tragedy on the Trail (1967) as Joe Carlson
Trial by Terror (1967) as Joe Carlson
Chester, Yesterday's Horse (1973) as Ben Kincaid
The Flight of the Grey Wolf, Parts 1 and 2 (1976) as The Sheriff
 The Millionaire
The Kathy Munson Story (1956) as Donald Abbott
Millionaire Martha Halloran (1959) as Clint Halloran
 Westinghouse Desilu Playhouse
The Untouchables, Parts 1 and 2 (1959) as Martin Flaherty
 Perry Mason
The Case of the Crippled Cougar (1962) as Mike Preston
The Case of the Bluffing Blast (1963) as Floyd Grant
The Case of the Murderous Mermaid (1965) as Charles Shaw
The Case of the 12th Wildcat (1965) as Burt Payne
 Batman
Fine Finny Fiends (1966) as Multimillionaire
 Multimillionaire-Batman Makes the Scenes (1966) as Multimillionaire
 Lassie
Climb the Mountain Slowly (1964) as Vince
Lassie and the Buffalo (1966) as Jed Bingham
 The F.B.I.
The Runaways (1968) as David Warren
The Lost Man (1974) as Crawford
 Ironside
Nightmare Trip (1972) as Lt. Dacker
The Rolling Y (1975) as Sheriff Callahan
 Adam-12
Pick-Up (1971) as William Taylor (his wife, Barbara Hale, also appeared in the episode)
Routine Patrol: The Drugstore Cowboys (1974) as Fred Wheeler
 The Rookies
Three Hours to Kill (1973) as Captain Fin Whitfield
Get Ryker (1973) as Captain Fin Whitfield
 Something Less Than a Man (1974) as Captain Johnson
 Police Woman (1974)
The End Game (1974) as Lt. Graumann
Sarah Who? (1976) as Captain
"Guns" (1977) Captain Williams
"Blind Terror" (1978) as Captain Miller

Miscellaneous television appearances

 Adventures in Jazz (1949) as Host
 The Bigelow Theatre, Make Your Bed (1951)
 Dragnet, The Big Pug (1954)
 The Red Skelton Show, Deadeye vs. The Lone Ranger (1955) as Kit Carson
 Studio 57, Young Couples Only (1955) as Rick Thompson
 Damon Runyon Theater, Miracle Jones (1956) as Andy Gubbins
 M Squad, Girl Lost (1958) as Jerry Langdon
 Yancy Derringer, Ticket to Natchez (1958) as Duke Winslow
 General Electric Theater, The Flying Wife (1959) as Stewart Davidson
 Bachelor Father, East Meets West (1959) as Rock Randall
 Men into Space, Asteroid (1959) as Dr. Stacy Croydon
 Laramie, Man of God (1959) as Charlie Root
 The Investigators, New Sound For the Blues (1961)
 Hawaiian Eye, Location Shooting (1962) as Norman Ayres
 Lawman, Get Out of Town (1962)
 Target: The Corruptors!, Goodbye Children (1962) as Walter Parker
 77 Sunset Strip, The Snow Job Caper (1962) as Steve Moran
 Law of the Lawless (1964) as Silas Miller
 Rawhide, The Lost Herd (1964)
 The Wild Wild West, Night of the Casual Killer (1965) as Marshal Kirby
 Dragnet 1967, The Big Frustration (1967) as Sgt. Bill Riddle
 Daniel Boone, The Spanish Horse (1967)
 Insight, A Thousand Red Flowers (1969) as Pop
 Marcus Welby, M.D., To Carry the Sun in a Golden Cup (1970) as Lynch
 O'Hara, U.S. Treasury, Operation Smokescreen (1972) as Willoughby
 Emergency!, Body Language (1973) as Pete
 Dusty's Trail, Then There Were Seven (1973) as The Sheriff
 Gunsmoke, Talbott (1973) as Red
 The Streets of San Francisco, The Unicorn (1973) as Burt Logan
 The Quest, Seminole Negro Indian Scouts (1976)
 B. J. and the Bear, Odyssey of the Shady Truth (1979) as Seth
 240-Robert, Stuntman (1979) as Harry Phillips

Theatrical films

 King Kong (1933) as Theatre Usher (uncredited)
 Murder in the Blue Room (1944) as Larry Dearden
 He Forgot to Remember to Forget (1944) as Mac, the Policeman (uncredited)
 Thirty Seconds Over Tokyo (1944) as Bud Felton
 Zombies on Broadway (1945) as Sailor / Smuggler (uncredited)
 Those Enduring Young Charms (1945) as Jerry
 The Body Snatcher (1945) as Survis, medical student (uncredited)
 Back to Bataan (1945) (uncredited)
 West of the Pecos (1945) as Tex Evans, stage guard (uncredited)
 Johnny Angel (1945) as Big Sailor (uncredited)
 Sing Your Way Home (1945) as Officer (uncredited)
 Deadline at Dawn (1946) as Alex Winkley
 Till the End of Time (1946) as Perry Kincheloe
 A Likely Story (1947) as Bill Baker
 A Woman's Secret (1949) as Lee Crenshaw
 The Stratton Story (1949) as Eddie Dibson
 The Clay Pigeon (1949) as Jim Fletcher
 Fighting Man of the Plains (1949) as Marshal Johnny Tancred
 A Dangerous Profession (1949) as Claude Brackett
 Blue Grass of Kentucky (1950) as Lin McIvor
 Operation Haylift (1950) as Bill Masters
 The Cariboo Trail (1950) as Mike Evans, Redfern's Partner
 Rookie Fireman (1950) as Joe Blake
 California Passage (1950) as Bob Martin
 Blue Blood (1951) as Bill Manning
 The Great Missouri Raid (1951) as Jim Younger
 The Last Outpost (1951) as Sgt. Tucker
 Havana Rose (1951) as Tex Thompson
 Rose of Cimarron (1952) as George Newcomb
 The Pace That Thrills (1952) as Richard L. "Dusty" Weston
 Son of Paleface (1952) as Kirk
 Torpedo Alley (1952) as Lt. Tom Graham
 Racing Blood (1954) as Tex
 The Outlaw's Daughter (1954) as Jess Raidley, a.k.a. Big Red
 Wiretapper (1955) as Jim Vaus, Jr.
 Apache Ambush (1955) as James Kingston
 Hell's Horizon (1955) as Paul Jenkins
 The Wild Dakotas (1956) as Jim Henry
 The Broken Star (1956) as Deputy Marshal Bill Gentry
 The Halliday Brand (1957) as Clay Halliday
 The Storm Rider (1957) as Sheriff Pete Colton
 Pawnee (1957) as Matt Delaney
 Slim Carter (1957) as Frank Hanneman
 Space Master X-7 (1958) as John Hand
 Legion of the Doomed (1958) as Lt. Smith
 Alaska Passage (1959) as Al Graham
 A Dog's Best Friend (1959) as Wesley "Wes" Thurman
 Oklahoma Territory (1960) as Temple Houston
 Hell to Eternity (1960) as Leonard
 The Sergeant Was a Lady (1961) as Col. House
 Law of the Lawless (1964) as Silas Miller
 A Letter to Nancy (1965) as George Reed
 Tickle Me (1965) as Deputy Sturdivant
 Spaceflight IC-1 (1965) as Capt. Mead Ralston
 Buckskin (1968) as Frank Cody
 Lady Godiva Rides (1969)
 Rio Lobo (1970) as Blackthorne Sheriff Pat Cronin
 Scandalous John (1971) as Sheriff Hart
 The Phantom of Hollywood (1974) as Fogel
 The Giant Spider Invasion (1975) as Dutch
 Moon Over the Alley (1976) as Sherry
 69 Minutes (1977)
 A Fire in the Sky (1978) as Dale Turner
 Night of the Zombies (1981)
 Goldie and the Boxer Go To Hollywood (1981) as Cowboy Bob (final film role)

References

External links

 
 

1915 births
1992 deaths
American male film actors
American male television actors
Burials at Forest Lawn Memorial Park (Hollywood Hills)
Deaths from brain cancer in the United States
American people of German descent
20th-century American male actors
United States Army personnel of World War II
United States Army soldiers
Male actors from New York City
Military personnel from New York City
Male Western (genre) film actors
Western (genre) television actors